Lukas Rifesser (born 17 July 1986, Bruneck, South Tyrol, Italy) is an Italian middle-distance runner. He has won the Italian Athletics Championships twice, once in the 800 metres (2010) and once in the 1500 metres (2008). Rifesser has also competed in the World Youth Championships, World Championships and the World Indoor Championships. He represented his country at the 2010 European Athletics Championships.

International Competitions

Personal bests

References

External links

1986 births
Living people
Sportspeople from Bruneck
Italian male middle-distance runners
World Athletics Championships athletes for Italy